The Hispaniolan gambusia (Gambusia hispaniolae) is a fish endemic to the island of Hispaniola.

Taxonomy
William L. Fink wrote its species description in a 1971 revision of the Gambusia nicaraguensis species group. Some specimens of this species had previously been misidentified as Gambusia dominicensis. Fink named this species after the island of Hispaniola, where this fish is found. The holotype is in the Smithsonian and the type locality is Trou Caïman, Plaine du Cul-de-Sac in Ouest, Haiti.

Phylogeny
One phylogenetic analysis showed that G. hispaniolae is a sister species to G. punctata and G. rhizophorae.

Distribution and habitat
It is found in Haiti and western Dominican Republic. It is normally found in springs which flow into brackish and saline lagoons.

Description

References

Further reading

External links

Fish described in 1971
Taxa named by William Lee Fink
Endemic fauna of Hispaniola
Fish of the Dominican Republic
Gambusia